Gwangju is a city in Gyeonggi Province, South Korea, a suburb southeast of Seoul.  The city is not to be confused with the much larger Gwangju Metropolitan City, former capital of South Jeolla Province, South Korea.

History
Bunwon-ri in Gwangju took an important role of ceramic production during the Kingdom of Joseon. There had official kilns and produced superb quality of white porcelains for use at the royal court and to export to China.

In 1962, 4 myeons (townships) including 5 ris (villages) were incorporated to Seoul.

In 1973, 6 ris were separated and became a part of Seongnam city. In 1979, Gwangju-myeon was elevated to an eup. Gwangju county became a city in 2001.

Festival 
Gwangju Toechon Tomato Festival - Gwangju City, Gyeonggi Province has been holding a festival since 2003 to promote the city's pollution-free tomatoes and sell them to consumers.

Climate 
Gwangju has a monsoon-influenced humid continental climate (Köppen: Dwa) with cold, dry winters and hot, rainy summers.

Notable people
 Ahn Sun-ju (1987), professional golfer
 Kim Yu-bin (1988), singer and actress
 Choi Soo-young (1990), singer and actress, member of Girls' Generation.
 Lee Hong-gi (1990), singer and actor
 Lee Hye-ri (1994), singer and actress
 Julio Ko (1970), kayaker and educator
 Yoon Shi-yoon (1986), actor and variety entertainer 
 Hyungwon (1994), member of boy group Monsta X
 Lee Ju-yeon (1998), member of boy group The Boyz

International relations

Sister cities
 Zibo, Shandong, China

Friendship cities
 Faku County, Liaoning, China
 Dornogovi Province, Mongolia
 Bathurst, New South Wales, Australia

See also
Joseon white porcelain
Korean pottery and porcelain
List of cities in South Korea
Geography of South Korea

Notes

References

Citations

Bibliography
 .

External links

City government website 
City Council website  

 

 
Cities in Gyeonggi Province